Miikka Pitkänen (born 27 April 1996) is a Finnish ice hockey player. He is currently playing with KooKoo in the Finnish Liiga.

Pitkänen made his Liiga debut playing with KalPa during the 2013–14 season.

References

External links

1996 births
Living people
Finnish ice hockey forwards
KalPa players
KooKoo players
Ice hockey players at the 2012 Winter Youth Olympics
Youth Olympic gold medalists for Finland
People from Kuopio
Sportspeople from North Savo